Red Beans is an album by American jazz organist Jimmy McGriff recorded in 1976 and released on the Groove Merchant label.

Reception 

Allmusic's Jason Ankeny said: "'On Red Beans, Jimmy McGriff rolls out electric piano and clavinet alongside his signature Hammond B-3 to create one of the more varied and unusual sessions in his discography. Brad Baker's smooth, fusion-inspired arrangements further distance the album from McGriff's seminal soul-jazz sets, but the approach – in every sense a product of its times – suits him well, and even though the material is lightweight, with a regrettable reliance on novelty titles, McGriff's absolute mastery of the groove remains unquestioned".

Track listing
All compositions by Brad Baker and Lance Quinn except where noted
 "Red Beans" – 6:10
 "Big Booty Bounce" – 6:12
 "Space Cadet" (Bob Babbitt) – 5:58
 "Cakes Alive" – 6:02
 "Sweet Love" (Jerry Friedman) – 4:35
 "Love Is My Life" – 6:47

Personnel
Jimmy McGriff – organ, piano, electric piano, clavinet
Randy Brecker, Jon Faddis, Alan Rubin – trumpet
Barry Rogers, David Taylor – trombone
Mike Brecker, Lew Delgatto, George Young – saxophone
Pat Rebillot – keyboards
Lance Quinn – guitar, musical supervisor
Jerry Friedman – guitar
Bob Babbitt – bass
Barry Lazarowitz, Gary Mure – drums
Jimmy Maelen – percussion
Carol Webb, Harold Kohan, Harry Cykman, Harry Glickman, Harry Lookofsky, John Pintavalle, Norman Carr, Peter Dimitriades, Richard Sortomme, Tony Posk – violin
Julian Barber, Seymour Berman – viola
Jesse Levy, Kermit Moore – cello
Arnold McCullen, David Lasley – vocals
Brad Baker – conductor

References

Groove Merchant albums
Jimmy McGriff albums
1976 albums
Albums produced by Sonny Lester